Wytheville Historic District is a national historic district located at Wytheville, Wythe County, Virginia. The district encompasses 245 contributing buildings in the historic core of the town of Wytheville.  They are primarily residential and commercial buildings and structures dating from about the 1830s to early 1940s. Notable buildings include the Fleming K. Rich House (1830s), Edith Bolling Galt Wilson Birthplace, Ephraim McGavock House (1858), Holy Trinity Lutheran Church (1876), Wytheville AM&O station (1873), Wythe County Courthouse (1902), George Wythe Hotel (1927), Millwald Theatre (1928), Trinkle Mansion, and Wytheville Municipal Building (1929), The Haller-Gibboney Rock House and St. John's Episcopal Church are located in the district and listed separately.

It was listed on the National Register of Historic Places in 1994.

References

Historic districts in Wythe County, Virginia
National Register of Historic Places in Wythe County, Virginia
Historic districts on the National Register of Historic Places in Virginia